Ralph LeMoine Andrews,  recipient of the Order of Canada for his work in the improvement of education and welfare in Newfoundland and for notable contributions to the development of his province and to his own community of St. John's.

See also
List of people of Newfoundland and Labrador

External links
Order of Canada, List of Newfoundland and Labrador Recipients
Order of Canada

Members of the Order of Canada
Living people
Year of birth missing (living people)